= National Insurance Company of Palestine =

Palestinian insurance company

- Industry: Insurance
- Founded: 1992
- Headquarters: Ramallah, Palestine
- Key people: Bashar Hussein, CEO
- Products: Insurance services
- Website: www.nic-pal.com

National Insurance Company (nic) is the first insurance company in Palestine, established in 1992 and commenced operations on March 1, 1993. The company was founded by a group of Palestinian businessmen and experienced individuals in the early stages of political and economic developments in Palestine. In 2023, the company launched its first service, becoming the first and only insurance provider in Palestine to offer coverage against settler attacks and military actions by the Israeli Defense Forces that result in material damage to Palestinians.
